McDonald Creek is an intermittent stream, about  long, heading about  south-southwest of Crosbyton, Texas, and trending generally southeast to join the Salt Fork Brazos River near the community of Verbena, Texas.

Geography
McDonald Creek rises along the eastern edge of the Caprock Escarpment of the Llano Estacado. The stream then runs southeast where it merges with the Salt Fork Brazos River at a low-water crossing on Farm to Market Road 2008, near the sparsely populated community of Verbena.

See also
List of rivers of Texas
Caprock Escarpment
Canyon Valley, Texas
Double Mountains (Texas)
Duffy's Peak

References

External links

Rivers of Crosby County, Texas
Rivers of Garza County, Texas
Rivers of Texas